Bryngwyn is a village and rural location in Monmouthshire, south east Wales.

Location 
Bryngwyn is located two miles to the west of Raglan in Monmouthshire.

History and amenities 

Bryngwyn is a rural area  close to Raglan Castle and with easy access to Abergavenny, Raglan, Usk and Monmouth. The village church is dedicated to St. Peter. Richard Crawley was born here in 1840.

External links 
 Genuki info on the village
 

Villages in Monmouthshire